The Gorakhpur Metrolite is a light rapid transit system proposed for the city of Gorakhpur, Uttar Pradesh, India. The network will consist of 2 elevated lines serving 27 stations with a total length of 27.41 kilometres. The project is estimated to cost . It is expected to be completed by 2024.

History 
The Government of Uttar Pradesh appointed the Uttar Pradesh Metro Rail Corporation to build a metro system in Gorakhpur in 2017. Rail India Technical and Economic Service prepared the feasibility study and the detailed project report for the project and submitted it to the corporation in March 2019. The report was approved by the state cabinet on 9 October 2020.

The Public Investment Board approved the first phase of the project on 22 November 2021, and the project is expected to be completed by 2024.

Route Network 
The first line would be constructed from Shyam Nagar to Sooba Bazaar covering a distance of 16.95 km and comprise 16 stations whereas the second line would be constructed from Gulariha to Kachehri Chauraha covering a distance of 10.46 km and comprise 11 stations.

Line 1 (Shyam Nagar – Sooba Bazar)
Length: 16.95 km

Alignment: Elevated 

No. of Stations: 16

Stations:
Shyam Nagar
Bargadwa
Shastri Nagar
Nathmalpur
Gorakhnath Mandir
Hazaripur
Dharmshala (Interchange)
Gorakhpur Railway Station
University
Mohaddipur
Ramgarh Lake
AIIMS
Malviya Nagar
MMM Engineering College
Divya Nagar
Sooba Bazar

Line 2 (Gulariha – Kachehri Chauraha)
Length: 10.46 km

Alignment: Elevated 

No. of Stations: 11

Stations:
Gulariha
BRD Medical College
Mugalaha 
Khanjanchi Bazar
Basharatpur
Ashok Nagar
Vishnu Nagar
Asuran Chowk
Dharamshala (Interchange)
Gol Ghar
Kachehri Chauraha

See also 
 Urban rail transit in India
 Kanpur Metro
 Lucknow Metro

References

Proposed rapid transit in Uttar Pradesh
Transport in Gorakhpur